Stephen is a 2021 British limited crime drama TV series. It is the sequel to the 1999 TV film The Murder of Stephen Lawrence. It stars Steve Coogan, Sharlene Whyte and Hugh Quarshie. It was written by Frank Cottrell-Boyce and Joe Cottrell-Boyce and directed by Alrick Riley. The series was produced for ITV by HTM Television, a joint venture between Hat Trick Productions and the producer Jed Mercurio.

Plot
Based on the true story of the 1993 murder of Black British teenager Stephen Lawrence, the series adapts In Pursuit of the Truth by DCI Clive Driscoll,. It follows Lawrence's family's fight for justice, and the police investigation which finally led to the convictions of two of his killers in 2012.

Cast
Steve Coogan as DCI Clive Driscoll
Sharlene Whyte as Doreen Lawrence
Hugh Quarshie as Neville Lawrence

Episodes 
All episodes were made available on ITV Hub as a boxset on 30 August 2021.

Awards
The show was nominated under Limited Series, and Sharlene Whyte nominated in the Actor (Female) category, in the 2022 Royal Television Society Awards.

References

External links 
 

2021 British television series debuts
2021 British television series endings
English-language television shows
ITV (TV network) original programming
Television series by Hat Trick Productions
2020s British crime television series
British crime drama television series